Fågelsjö is a Swedish village in the Gävleborg County, Dalarna. It is also called Bortom Åa, meaning 'Beyond the river'. Known for its folk museum, Gammelgården, the village was established by second generation immigrants from Finland around 1700. It is one of the UNESCO World Heritage Site farms.

References

External links
 Fågelsjö Gammelgård website

Populated places in Ljusdal Municipality
Dalarna